Matthew Theron Ruff (born September 8, 1965) is an American author of thriller, science-fiction and comic novels, including The Mirage and Lovecraft Country, the latter having been adapted in 2020 by HBO into a TV series.

Early life
Ruff was born in New York City in 1965 to a Lutheran family of German ancestry. His father was a hospital chaplain, and his maternal grandfather was a missionary. At the age of 5, he decided he wanted to be a fiction writer. He spent his childhood and adolescence learning how to tell stories. In elementary school, he wrote a number of short stories, many of them starring his classmates in scenarios cribbed from movies or TV. Ruff has said that reading these aloud in English class was his first experience performing in front of an audience and his first solid evidence that he had what it took to entertain people with his storytelling. Many adults around him attempted to persuade him to choose a different career, but Ruff's mother was supportive of his hope to become a writer; for one of Ruff's birthdays, she bought him an IBM Selectric typewriter. From third to eighth grade, Ruff attended a parochial school. He attended Stuyvesant High School in Manhattan; one of his teachers there was the memoirist Frank McCourt.

Ruff's first sustained effort at a novel was a soap opera–like story about a family with a lot of children (having only older half siblings, Ruff was fascinated by the concept of siblings). He wrote it in the 1970s, but never published it. Describing it, Ruff said "Think Eight Is Enough with surreal elements. There was no overall plot, just a series of loosely linked episodes—a chapter about the boys and girls digging competing tunnel systems under the house would be followed by one in which they got infected by some weird flu strain and started passing out in the halls. Periodically I’d set aside what I’d written and start the whole thing over again".

During Ruff's last semester at Cornell University, his mother died. He graduated in 1987. One of Ruff's English professors had been Alison Lurie, who helped Ruff find an agent.

His father died after Ruff's first novel was published.

Unpublished novels
In the late 1970s and early 1980s, Ruff wrote a fantasy novel that he never completed. Between 1982 and 1984, Ruff wrote a semi-autobiographical novel about a Lutheran Minister's son who questions his faith. Part of Ruff's motive for writing the novel was to let his parents know he wasn't going to be a devout Christian, which they had hoped he would. In 1985, Ruff wrote a coming-of-age story set in Queens called "Today's Tom Sawyer", over the summer between his sophomore and junior years at Cornell. It had upwards of 400 pages, which Ruff wrote in three months. Ruff based a character in the story on a female student in his class, and gave her a copy of the finished manuscript.

Published works
Ruff's first novel, Fool on the Hill, is a fantasy that drew on his experiences living in Risley Residential College at Cornell. It was first written as his senior thesis in Honors English. It was published shortly after Ruff graduated from the university.

His second book Sewer, Gas & Electric: The Public Works Trilogy is postcyberpunk.

His third book Set This House in Order: A Romance of Souls, focuses on two protagonists displaying a fictionalised version of dissociative identity disorder; while not technically science-fiction, it nonetheless contains significant speculative elements.

 Fool on the Hill (1988) –
 Sewer, Gas & Electric: The Public Works Trilogy (1997) –
 Set This House in Order: A Romance of Souls (2003) –
 Bad Monkeys (2007) –
 The Mirage (2012) –
 Lovecraft Country (2016) –
 88 Names (2020) –
 The Destroyer of Worlds: A Return to Lovecraft Country (2023) –

Awards
Set This House in Order was long-listed for the 2005 International Dublin Literary Award and won the 2007 James Tiptree, Jr. Award, a PNBA Book Award, and a Washington State Book Award. Ruff is also the recipient of a 2006 National Endowment for the Arts Literature Fellowship in Prose

Bad Monkeys received the 2008 Washington State Book Award for Fiction, a PNBA Book Award, and an Alex Award.

The Mirage was nominated for the Sidewise Award for Alternate History.

Lovecraft Country was nominated World Fantasy Award in 2017 for the Novel category.

References

External links
Homepage

Goodreads Author page
Mostlyfiction.com interview with Matt Ruff, author of Bad Monkeys

20th-century American novelists
21st-century American novelists
American male novelists
American fantasy writers
American science fiction writers
Cornell University alumni
1965 births
Living people
Stuyvesant High School alumni
People from Queens, New York
Writers from Seattle
20th-century American male writers
21st-century American male writers
Novelists from New York (state)
Novelists from Washington (state)
American people of German descent
Weird fiction writers